Tetrapyrgia is a genus of moths.

Tetrapyrgia may also refer to:
Tetrapyrgia (Cappadocia), town of ancient Cappadocia
Tetrapyrgia (Pamphylia), town of ancient Pamphylia